William Earl Rowe,  (May 13, 1894 – February 9, 1984), was a politician in Ontario, Canada.  He served as the 20th Lieutenant Governor of Ontario from 1963 to 1968.

Background
Rowe was born in Hull, Iowa, United States, of Canadian parents in 1894. He moved to Ontario with his family at the age of two and grew up to become a farmer and cattle breeder. In 1917, he married Treva Alda Lillian Lennox. Together, they had four children, one of which died during labour.

Politics
He was reeve of the township of West Gwillimbury from 1919 to 1923. Rowe served as a Member of Provincial Parliament from 1923 to 1925, when elected to the House of Commons, where he served until 1935.

From 1936 to 1938, he was leader of Conservative Party of Ontario, but he did not have a seat in the legislature and so George S. Henry remained Leader of the Opposition.

In the public mind, the cause of labour was identified with the American Congress of Industrial Organizations and communism. During the 1937 provincial election, when Liberal premier Mitchell Hepburn was railing against the CIO's attempt to unionize General Motors and the supposed threat posed by organized labour, Rowe refused to take a stand against the CIO and repeatedly asserted that "the issue was not law and order but the right of free association." The Conservatives were then strongly associated with the Orange Order, which had long held a pro-labour position. Rowe's stance resulted in George A. Drew breaking with the party to run unsuccessfully as an "Independent Conservative" in the 1937 election in opposition to Rowe's position.

Rowe failed to win his seat in the 1937 provincial election but successfully ran in a by-election held in November 1937 to regain the seat in the federal House of Commons from which he had resigned two months earlier to run in the provincial election. He was succeeded as leader by his former rival, Drew.  Drew went on to serve as Premier of Ontario in the 1940s before he moved to federal politics.

Rowe served in the House of Commons until 1962. On two occasions (1954–1955 and 1956) when Drew, who had by this point become federal PC leader, was unable to perform his duties because of ill health, Rowe served as acting leader of the official opposition.

From 1958 to 1962, he and his daughter, Jean Casselman Wadds, were the only father and daughter to ever sit together in Parliament.

Later life
Rowe was lieutenant governor of Ontario from 1963 to 1968. A champion and supporter of agriculture and rural affairs, particularly harness horse racing, he died in 1984 at Newton Robinson, Ontario.

Legacy
The Honourable Earl Rowe Public School, in Bradford, Ontario, and Earl Rowe Provincial Park, near Alliston, are named in his honour.

References

External links

William Earl Rowe – Canadian Horse Racing Hall of Fame

1894 births
1984 deaths
Lieutenant Governors of Ontario
Members of the House of Commons of Canada from Ontario
Conservative Party of Canada (1867–1942) MPs
Progressive Conservative Party of Canada MPs
Progressive Conservative Party of Ontario MPPs
Leaders of the Opposition (Canada)
Leaders of the Progressive Conservative Party of Ontario
Members of the King's Privy Council for Canada
Members of the United Church of Canada
Politicians from Simcoe County
Farmers from Ontario
Mayors of places in Ontario
People from Hull, Iowa